The 1952 Syracuse Orangemen football team represented Syracuse University in the 1952 college football season. The Orangemen were led by fourth-year head coach Ben Schwartzwalder and played their home games at Archbold Stadium in Syracuse, New York.

This was a historically successful season for the Orangemen, which included victories over rivals Penn State and Colgate. Syracuse lost only twice in the regular season: their season opener against the former college all-stars of the Bolling Air Force Base, and to eventual national champions Michigan State. Syracuse finished the regular season with a record of 7–2 and were ranked 14th in the final AP Poll, their first ranked finish in school history.

The team was awarded its first Lambert Trophy, which signified them as champions of the East. They were invited to the 1953 Orange Bowl after Navy refused the bid. This was the school's first ever bowl game, where they lost to Alabama in a lopsided 61–6 game.

Schedule

References

Syracuse
Syracuse Orange football seasons
Lambert-Meadowlands Trophy seasons
Syracuse Orangemen football